Raffaello is a spherical coconut–almond truffle that Italian manufacturer Ferrero brought to the market in 1990. It consists of a spherical wafer which is filled with a white milk cream and white blanched almonds. It is then surrounded by a coconut layer. It does contain lactose, making Raffaello incompatible for consumers with lactose intolerance.

Ferrero factories which manufacture Raffaello include Vladimir, Russia; Brantford, Canada; and Arlon, Belgium. Russia is Ferrero's largest market for Raffaello.

In 2008, Belgian company Soremartec (part of the Ferrero Group) began legal action against Landrin, a Ukrainian company which began producing a sweet in 2007 similar to Raffaello, called Waferatto. Soremartec filed a claim on the grounds that Landrin had violated Soremartec's trademark protecting the appearance of the Raffaello sweets. After a lengthy court battle, the High Commercial Court of Ukraine ruled in favor of Landrin, cancelling the validity of Soremartec's trademark.

In 2017, a court in Frankfurt in Germany ruled that Ferrero would have to list the number of Raffaello sweets in each packet sold, rather than simply providing the weight.

See also
 List of confectionery brands

References

External links

 

Products introduced in 1990
Ferrero SpA brands